Leon Steven Klatzkin (1914–1992) was an American music arranger, composer, and conductor remembered for his long career in the Hollywood motion picture and television industries.

A prolific film and television composer, orchestra conductor, soundtrack orchestrator and arranger, Klatzkin worked in the music department of the Hal Roach Studios as a musician for eight years, afterwards working throughout Hollywood, notably for 20th Century-Fox. Klatzkin joined ASCAP in 1952, and his list of compositions there numbers over 600, nearly all of them themes for film and television. In the 1960s, Klatzkin was under contract to CBS television, and composed and arranged for many shows there, including 84 episodes of the popular western series Gunsmoke.

The opening and closing theme of the TV series Adventures of Superman is credited to Leon Klatzkin. Despite ASCAP and the Los Angeles Times listing his many compositions for television shows, some suggest that Klatzkin was nothing more than a Mutel employee; A film cutter who helped editors select appropriate tracks for their pictures. There is a veritable industry dedicated to the attribution of the Superman theme to various other composers. Klatzkin reached a settlement with John Williams over Williams' appropriation of the Superman theme - With proceeds going to a children's charity. The dispute with Williams appears to have inspired the noted disparagement.

Selected filmography
 Inner Sanctum (1948)
 As You Were (1951)
 Captain Scarface (1953)
 Go, Johnny, Go! (1959)

References

Bibliography
 Terrace, Vincent. Encyclopedia of Television Pilots, 1937-2012. McFarland, 2013.

External links
   Classic 50's TV Themes

1914 births
1992 deaths
American composers